Yanteles is an isolated stratovolcano composed of five glacier-capped peaks along an 8 km-long NE-trending ridge.
The name Yanteles can refer only to the main summit, which is also known as Volcán Nevado (Spanish for "Snow-covered Volcano").

Geography and geology 

The volcano lies in the Chaitén municipality, Palena region, Los Lagos Region of Chile. Three stratovolcanoes developed on a north-south trending fault and five peaks form a ridge trending northeastward. Volcanoes like Yanteles form the highest summits of the Andes at these latitudes. It also features a caldera with a pyroclastic cone. Eroded peaks occur in the vicinity and Nevado and Yeli are volcanic necks associated with the system. Another major fault in the region is the Melimoyu-Yanteles Fault.

It is covered by sizeable glaciers, which with an area of  form one of the largest areas of ice in the region.

Yanteles has erupted basaltic andesite. The volcano is geologically part of the Southern Volcanic Zone of the Andes.

History and hazards 

The volcano was active in the Pleistocene-Holocene and the last major eruption was 6,650 BCE. The volcano is considered to be a source of tephra layers such as the 7,240±150 BCE eruption that produced the YAN1 tephra. One tephra in the Siple Dome of Antarctica and tephras found in Patagonian lakes may come from Yanteles.

Yanteles is little known, but attested in a 1899 publication and was known to be a volcano as far back as 1916. The occurrence of historical eruptions is uncertain; Yanteles reportedly erupted a day after the 1835 Concepcion earthquake and activity continued for months, but little is known about this activity and its description as patches of bare rock or the disappearance of snow makes the record doubtful; such a change could constitute landsliding instead. Later activity is limited to fumarolic activity in 1982, 1992 and 1993-1995. Two fumarolic areas were reported in 1993 on the ridge,  from each other, and were emitting yellow-to-white steam.

Future eruptions could cause mudflows in the valleys around the volcano. It was classified as a type III volcano by SERNAGEOMIN, implying an intermediate volcanic hazard.

See also
 List of volcanoes in Chile
 Corcovado volcano

References

  (in Spanish; also includes volcanoes of Argentina, Bolivia, and Peru)

Sources

External links
 SI Google Earth Placemarks - Smithsonian Institution Global Volcanism Program: Download placemarks with SI  Holocene volcano-data.

External links 
 Glaciers of Yanteles

Volcanoes of Los Lagos Region
Mountains of Chile
Stratovolcanoes of Chile
Pleistocene stratovolcanoes
Holocene stratovolcanoes